The Aimpoint CompM4 is a non-magnified red dot style gun sight adopted by the U.S. Armed Forces, designated the M68 CCO (Close Combat Optic). It is produced by the Swedish company Aimpoint AB and is the successor to the earlier M68CCO, the Aimpoint CompM2.

Overview
The Aimpoint CompM4 is a "tubed" style reflector (reflex) sight that uses a red light-emitting diode (LED) at the focus of a mirror type optical collimator to produce an aligned red aiming spot (what is commonly called a red dot sight).    There are a total of 16 brightness settings for the LED, the lower 7 intended for use with night vision devices and the upper 9 for daylight. The CompM4 is powered by a standard AA battery, and the manufacturer claims that the sight will run continuously for 8 years on a single battery, in its 10th brightness setting.

Reflector sights have unlimited eye relief, meaning that the user may place his eye at any distance from the sight and the reticle will remain visible. This allows flexibility in mounting and shooting position. The CompM4 uses Aimpoint's "parallax-free" optical correction system, meaning there is minimal induced optical error that would shift the point of aim relative to the sight's optical axis as the user's eye moves off-center in relation to the sight. The sight itself is parallax-free at around 50 yards, meaning that the red dot will not change position relative to the target based on eye position at that range. As in other reflex sights, the point of aim will change position based on eye position at other ranges with the maximum error being equal to the diameter of the sight's optical window at short range. There are currently two variants available; the standard CompM4 and the CompM4S, the latter being the same in terms of features and functionality, but having the battery compartment & power control knob mounted near the bottom of the sight instead of near the top.

In 2009, the US Army selected the CompM4s to fulfill the M68 CCO program requirements and ordered 565,783 of the sights. This was followed by another order in 2017 for an additional 30,000 sights.

Dimensions
Length: 120 mm (4.7 in)
Width (sight only): 53 mm (2.1 in)
Height (sight only): 60 mm (2.4 in)
Width (including mount): 72 mm (2.8 in)
Height (including mount): 72 mm (2.8 in)
Mounting ring width: none (does not require mounting ring)
Weight (sight only): 265 g (9.3 oz)
Weight (including mount): 335 g (11.8 oz)

Users
: Used by Afghan Commandos on M4 carbine
: Used by Armenian Special Units.
 : Used by most Belgian Defence soldiers equipped with FN SCAR.

 : Used by Army of the Czech Republic soldiers equipped with CZ 805 BREN.
: Used by Hellenic Army SF.
: Used by the Armed forces of the Netherlands on the C7NLD, C8NLD, LOAWNLD, FN Minimi and the HK416.
: Used by the Indian Army's Para (Special Forces) and  Force One of the Mumbai Police on M4 carbine.
: Used by ISOF.

: Used by Portuguese Army and Guarda Nacional Republicana.

References

External links
Aimpoint AB

Firearm sights